Shanghai Sixth People's Hospital is a teaching hospital in Shanghai, China, affiliated with the School of Medicine, Shanghai Jiao Tong University. It attained the rank of "Grade 3, Class A", and belongs to Shanghai Health Care Bureau. It was founded as part of the China Inland Mission by Paul E. Adolph.

The hospital employs 653 medical staff including 218 doctors. The hospital has 600 standard beds, and comprises 33 clinical departments and 9 technical departments. It is the home to SJTU 6th clinical medical school, Shanghai Limbs Microsurgery Institute, and Shanghai Diabetes Institute. It is a teaching hospital of SJTU, Shanghai Traditional Chinese Medicine University, and Soochow University.

On 26 September 2009, the hospital began a major reconstruction, and reopened on 26 October 2016.

References

External links
 The official website of Shanghai Sixth People's Hospital

Teaching hospitals in Shanghai
Shanghai Jiao Tong University
Xuhui District